Atulugamage Shammi Shiraj Silva (born 7 August 1960) is a sports administrator and the current president (2019/2022) of Sri Lanka Cricket. Shammi was elected as President of SLC for another two year term when the election was held on 20 May 2021.

Early childhood
Silva was born in Colombo and attended Nalanda College, Colombo. At school he played Cricket, Putt-shot, Discus Throw and Javaline Throw. In 1980 Silva captained Nalanda's first XI cricket team.

Later life
After leaving school Silva continued playing cricket and captained Colombo Cricket Club in 1983/84.  Silva also played Squash (sport), resulting him winning National Colours and representing Sri Lanka Squash Team. He then became the manager and coach for Sri Lanka Squash team.

Silva was also one time Chairman of the Colombo Gymkhana Club.

Shammi is also the President of Colombo Gymkhana Club.

General references 

Living people
Alumni of Nalanda College, Colombo
Sinhalese sportspeople
Sri Lankan Buddhists
1960 births